Kamratgården  is a football stadium in Uddevalla, Sweden  and the home stadium for the football team IFK Uddevalla. Kamratgården has a total capacity of 1,500 spectators.

References 

Football venues in Sweden